Plum is an unincorporated community in Bourbon County, Kentucky, United States. It was also known as Pinhook.

References

Unincorporated communities in Bourbon County, Kentucky
Unincorporated communities in Kentucky